Kellie White (born 15 July 1991 in Crookwell, New South Wales) is an Australian field hockey player. White was a member of the Australia women's national field hockey team that were defeated by the Netherlands women's national field hockey team in the final of the 2014 Women's Hockey World Cup. She was also part of the squad's success in the 2014 Commonwealth Games in Glasgow after they beat England 3–1 on penalty shoot-outs. As of December 2016, she has 97 caps and 31 goals to her name. Her former club was Laggan Lilacs, Crookwell, NSW. She plays in the Forward position.

References

Living people
1991 births
Australian female field hockey players
Sportswomen from New South Wales
Field hockey players at the 2014 Commonwealth Games
Commonwealth Games medallists in field hockey
Commonwealth Games gold medallists for Australia
21st-century Australian women
Medallists at the 2014 Commonwealth Games